Ollie is a given name and a nickname, often as a shortened form of Oliver, Olive, Olympia, Olga or Olivia. Variants include Olie, Oli, Oly and Olly.

People

Given name
 Ollie Marie Adams (1925–1998), American gospel and R&B singer
 Ollie Bassett (born 1998), Northern Irish footballer
 Ollie E. Brown (born 1953), American drummer and record producer
 Ollie Grieve (1920–1978), Australian rules footballer
 Ollie Halsall (1949–1992), British vibraphonist and guitarist
 Ollie Murray James (1871–1918), American Senator and Representative from Kentucky
 Ollie Johnson (basketball, born 1942), American basketball player
 Ollie Johnson (basketball, born 1949), American basketball player
 Ollie Kilkenny (born 1962), Irish hurler
 Ollie Kirkby (1886–1964), American actress
 Ollie Luba (born 1964), American systems and aerospace engineer, early developer of GPS III
 Ollie Marquardt (1902–1968), American baseball player and manager
 Ollie Matson (1930–2011), American sprinter and football player
 Ollie Pope (born 1998), English cricketer
 Ollie Phillips (rugby union) (born 1983), English rugby union player
 Ollie le Roux (born 1973), South African rugby union footballer
 Ollie Imogene Shepard (1933–2016), pioneering American honky-tonk singer-songwriter
 Ollie Voigt (1899–1970), American baseball player

Olie
 Olie Cordill (1916–1988), American football player
 Olié Koffi, (born 1984), Ivorian footballer
 Olaf Kölzig (born 1970), German former goaltender known as "Olie the Goalie"
 Olie Sundstrom (born 1968), retired Swedish ice hockey goaltender

Oliver
 Olly Alexander (born 1990), English singer, songwriter and actor, lead singer of the band Years & Years
 Ollie Baker (born 1974), retired Irish hurler
 Ollie Banks (born 1992), English footballer
 Olly Barkley (born 1981), English rugby union player
 Ollie Canning (born 1977), Irish hurler
 Ollie Clarke (born 1992), British footballer
 Oliver Davies (disambiguation), several people
 Ollie Dobbins (born 1941), American football player
 Ollie Fahy (born 1975), Irish hurler
 Oliver Hardy (1892–1957), American comic actor best known as half of the Laurel and Hardy duo
 Ollie Hoskins (rugby union) (born 1993), Australian rugby union player
 Ollie Johnson (basketball, born 1942), American college basketball player
 Ollie Johnston (1912–2008), American film animator, one of Disney's famed "Nine Old Men"
 Olly Lee (born 1991), English footballer
 Ollie Locke (born 1987), British reality television personality
 Ollie Moran (born 1975), Irish hurler
 Oliver North (born 1943), American military officer and political commentator
 Ollie Pope (born 1998), English cricketer
 Oliver Riedel (born 1971), German musician, most notably with the band Rammstein
 Ollie Satenstein (c. 1906–1959), American National Football League player
 Ollie Savatsky (1911–1989), American football player
 Ollie Sleightholme (born 2000), English rugby union player
 Ollie Spencer (1931–1991), American National Football League player and assistant coach
 Ollie Tucker (1902–1940), Major League Baseball player
 Ollie Walsh (1937–1996), Irish hurling goalkeeper
 Ollie Wines (born 1994), Australian rules footballer

Olivia 

 Ollie Rae (born 1988), Scottish cricketer

Olga 
Olly Donner - Finnish writer

Other
 Alan Gelfand (born 1963), known by the nickname "Ollie", American inventor of the Ollie (skateboarding) trick
 Ian Holloway (born 1963), known by the nickname "Ollie", British football manager and former player

Fictional characters
 Ollie in the American television show Kukla, Fran and Ollie
 Ollie in the British comic strip Ollie and Quentin
 Ollie in the Canadian animated series Ollie's Pack
 Olly in The Sifl and Olly Show, a television show on MTV
 Ollie Millar, in the British soap opera Doctors
 Ollie Morgan, in the British soap opera Hollyoaks
 Ollie Pesto, in the American animated series Bob's Burgers
 Ollie Phillips, in the Australian soap opera Home And Away
 Ollie Reynolds, in the British soap opera Emmerdale
 Ollie Williams, in the American animated series Family Guy
 Ollie, a rabbit from the American animated series Wonder Pets
Olie Miramond, Misha's deceased mother from the animated series Transformers: Energon

Masculine given names
English masculine given names
English unisex given names
English-language unisex given names
Lists of people by nickname
Hypocorisms